The South African Railways Class 6K 4-6-0 of 1901 was a steam locomotive from the pre-Union era in the Cape of Good Hope.

In 1901, ten American-built 6th Class bar-framed steam locomotives with a  wheel arrangement were placed in service by the Cape Government Railways. In 1912, when they were assimilated into the South African Railways, they were renumbered and designated .

Manufacturer
The original Cape 6th Class locomotive was designed at the Salt River works of the Cape Government Railways (CGR) at the same time as the 7th Class.

Three new versions of the 6th Class locomotive entered service on the CGR in 1901, two American-built and one British-built. Of the two American-built versions, one was designed and built by Baldwin Locomotive Works to the specifications of the CGR locomotive department. These ten engines were consequently somewhat different in appearance from most previous Cape 6th Class locomotives.

Characteristics
They were larger than any of the previous 6th Class locomotives. Like the Schenectady-built Class 6G, they had larger boilers, large cabs and  bore cylinders, compared to the  bore cylinders of all the British-built 6th Class locomotives. They had bar frames, stovepipe chimneys and large domes and were the only 6th Class locomotives which were not delivered with Ramsbottom safety valves, having been equipped with the Pop type.

Apart from the stovepipe chimney, a visually obvious distinction was their coupled wheel counterweights, which were shaped like bent rectangles, instead of the usual curved and tapered counterweights which were used on most South African locomotives. Like other second generation 6th Class locomotives, they had higher running boards without driving wheel fairings. They were numbered in the range from 301 to 305 for the CGR’s Western System and in the range from 795 to 799 for the Eastern System.

Class 6 sub-classes
When the Union of South Africa was established on 31 May 1910, the three Colonial government railways (CGR, Natal Government Railways and Central South African Railways) were united under a single administration to control and administer the railways, ports and harbours of the Union. Although the South African Railways and Harbours came into existence in 1910, the actual classification and renumbering of all the rolling stock of the three constituent railways were only implemented with effect from 1 January 1912.

When these ten locomotives were assimilated into the South African Railways (SAR) in 1912, they were renumbered in the range from 649 to 658 and designated .

The rest of the CGR's 6th Class locomotives, together with the Central South African Railways (CSAR) Classes 6-L1 to 6-L3 locomotives which had been inherited from the Oranje-Vrijstaat Gouwerment-Spoorwegen (OVGS) via the Imperial Military Railways (IMR), were grouped into thirteen more sub-classes by the SAR. The  locomotives became SAR Classes 6, 6A to 6H, 6J and 6L, the  locomotives became Class 6Y and the  locomotives became Class 6Z.

Service
The Class 6 family of locomotives were introduced primarily as passenger locomotives, but when the class became displaced by larger and more powerful locomotive classes, it literally became a Jack-of-all-trades. It went on to see service in all parts of the country, except Natal, and was used on all types of traffic.

In SAR service, the Class 6K locomotives worked on the East London mainline until they were withdrawn by 1928.

Renumbering
The Class 6K engine number sequence does not correspond with its builder's works number sequence. The table lists the Class 6K works numbers, CGR engine numbers and SAR renumbering.

References

1410
4-6-0 locomotives
2′C n2 locomotives
Baldwin locomotives
Cape gauge railway locomotives
Railway locomotives introduced in 1901
1901 in South Africa
Scrapped locomotives